Collins High School can refer to a number of educational institutions in the United States:

 Collins Academy High School in Chicago
 Collins High School (Mississippi) in Collins, Mississippi
 Collins High School, the former name of Oak Hill High School in Oak Hill, West Virginia
 Martha Layne Collins High School in Shelbyville, Kentucky